Highland Park Independent School District (HPISD) is a public school district based in University Park, Texas, within the Dallas–Fort Worth metroplex. HPISD serves most of the town of Highland Park, all of the city of University Park, and two small portions of Dallas. Those two portions are one that is north of Greenbrier Drive, south of Northwest Highway, east of the Dallas North Tollway, and west of Douglas Avenue; and one that is west of Preston Road and north of Colgate Avenue. The Dallas Independent School District surrounds HPISD on all sides. HPISD administers seven schools and seven campuses. The District is run by a school board consisting of seven elected, unpaid members. The District's number for TEA reporting purposes is 057911.

History

John Scarbrough Armstrong was one of the major founders of the town and contents of Highland Park because he owned significant portions of the land that would become the town. In 1906, Armstrong purchased 1,400 acres of prairie land north of downtown Dallas. After his death on April 26, 1908, his widow and sons-in-law—Edgar Flippen and Hugh Prather—took over his work. On April 14, 1914, the newly incorporated town of Highland Park petitioned the Dallas County Judge to allow them to establish an independent school district. From 1909 until this time, children wishing to attend school had attended classes in a little red frame house operating under the name of "Highland Park School" that had been moved to the 4700 block of Abbott by community leader Michael Costello and a group of citizens. However, the judge granted the petition for an independent school district on May 5, 1914, and HPISD was born. Once the school district held an election for the first Board of Trustees, the Board began searching for a suitable location for the new school. Mrs. Alice Armstrong, widow of the late John S. Armstrong, generously donated the needed land in the area bounded by Cornell Avenue, Byron Avenue, and St. John's Drive in memory of her husband, thus helping found the HPISD and its first school, appropriately named Armstrong. The Board of Trustees approved $30,000 in bonds to build the new Armstrong School on July 16, 1914.

Highland Park residents spearheaded the creation of the HPISD and asked the neighbors to the north to become a part of the district; taxes were lower since the district included University Park's population.

Initially the district did not receive funds from the U.S. federal government. Its student body was entirely white. The servants' quarters in the houses did not have black children as the wealthy white families did not hire servants with families. As a result, HPISD had no black children in the 1950s and 1960s, when other Dallas-area school districts dealt with racial integration and white flight. The federal court orders to integrate had no effect in HPISD since it did not receive federal money.

As a result, values of HPISD-zoned properties in University Park rose dramatically and the demographic makeup became wealthier, with smaller houses being replaced by larger ones circa the 1970s.

Schools

Armstrong 

HPISD first opened its doors on October 12, 1914, with John S. Armstrong School, a one-story cream-yellow brick building on Cornell Avenue with only four rooms and a basement. The staff at the time included one principal, Belle Francis, and two teachers.  The fourth room was not needed and thus served as a Sunday school room. There being no easy transportation system, students simply walked to school each morning across the open fields that would later become residential areas of Highland Park. After the passage of a couple years to 1916, the staff had grown in size to include twelve teachers, most without college degrees, and the student enrollment had grown to 140 students, ranging from kindergartners to high school sophomores. Students wishing to complete high school had to go to Bryan Street High School in Dallas (originally called Dallas High School and later Crozier Tech). Some of the Armstrong School staff at the time included Francis herself as well as Mary Inis (kindergarten), Katherine Mansfield (first grade), and Anne Rose McLean (second grade). To accommodate these increases in size, a second story was added to the original Armstrong School building in 1916 which allowed for an additional four classrooms, a clinic, and an office. The first-ever HPISD yearbook was published following the 1916–1917 school year under the title The Highlander, a name which remains to this day. It was dedicated to Mrs. Armstrong with the following inscription:

TO HER who has ever proven in every way a faithful friend of our beloved school, and an ardent sympathizer in and promoter of its best interest, to Mrs. John S. Armstrong, this, our first volume is affectionately dedicated.

Following the approval of the 2015 bond package, Armstrong Elementary School will receive a much-needed addition and renovation which began in December 2017.

Middle School & Intermediate School 
In 1922, a second school was added to the district: a new building between Normandy Avenue and Granada Avenue which would house Highland Park High School. Grades eight and above moved to the new high school, and the first class graduated from Highland Park High School in 1924. Superintendent Gable moved his office from Armstrong School to the high school. After the addition of the high school building on Emerson Avenue, this building turned the home of Highland Park Junior High School for students in grades seven through nine. Eventually it would come to house Highland Park Middle School and Arch H. McCulloch Intermediate School and collectively serve grades five through eight. Following the approval of the 2015 bond package, the building will receive a parking garage built underneath the existing athletics fields.

Bradfield 
As the student body size increased, the district added another school in 1926, Bradfield Elementary, located between Southern Avenue and Mockingbird Lane. The funds for the school came from a 1925 bond election for $250,000 to build the Bradfield Elementary and University Park Elementary Schools. To conserve money, both schools had identical blueprints: two-story brick structures with 12 rooms each. Named after former HPISD board president John S. Bradfield, Bradfield Elementary School is located in Block 150 of Highland Park West, and uses a Spanish Colonial Revival style. Foshee & Creek designed the school building with a cost of $68,200. The building permit was filed in 1930. Following the approval of the 2015 bond package, Bradfield Elementary School will be torn down and rebuilt beginning in the summer of 2018.

University Park 
In 1928, the District added University Park Elementary School on Lovers Lane with the remaining funds from the 1925 bond election discussed above. The school was named after the city that it served.  The time capsule was presumably discovered during the 2017 demolition of the building. Following the approval of the 2015 bond package, University Park Elementary School closed its doors for the 2017–2018 school year and was completely demolished. On May 17, 2017, before the demolition of the school, the District allowed former students and educators a chance to visit one last time. The demolition also affected longtime janitor Jesus Gonzalez who had lived in a District-owned house on the UP campus for years; in 2017, the community surprised Gonzalez and his wife with a check for $53,000 and the District agreed to provide them housing for the rest of their lives. UP Elementary School students attended classes in the new building on Wentwood Drive during this time—what would become the fifth elementary school. They were the first students to ever use the new building on Wentwood Drive. Meanwhile, a new building for UP Elementary School was being built with a parking garage underneath it. The new UP Elementary School is on track to open in August 2018 for the 2018–2019 school year. The rebuild was done by Stantec Inc. and Balfour Beatty Construction.

High school 

In 1937, a new building on Emerson Avenue opened its doors and became the home of Highland Park High School—where the high school has remained to this day. It cost taxpayers approximately $400,000 at the time. At around the same time, the education system added a twelfth grade, so the new Highland Park High School served students in grades ten through twelve. The old high school building on Normandy Avenue became a junior high school for students in grades seven through nine. The new building featured 32 classrooms, 2 gyms, 2 auditoriums, a library, a cafeteria, an armory, a clinic, offices, a public address system, tennis courts, a greenhouse, and a football field with permanent seats. In 1951, a new administration building near the high school campus opened.  Today, Highland Park High School features three large plaques just inside the main entrance on Emerson Avenue which list the names of all HPHS alumni who went on to serve in the U.S. Armed Forces.

Hyer 

From 1947-1949, yet another elementary was built: Hyer Elementary School, which opened for classes in January 1949. The building would have opened in 1941 if not for a steel shortage caused by World War II which delayed the construction. The Hyer Elementary School building was designed by architect Mark Lemmon and cost $408,000. Hyer Elementary School was named after Dr. Robert Stewart Hyer, a pioneer in education in Texas and the president of Southwestern University in Georgetown, Texas, from 1898 to 1911. Dr. Hyer is also well known for helping to found nearby Southern Methodist University and serving as its first president from 1911 to 1920. Newton L. Manning was the first principal of Hyer and frequently brought chickens, goats, and other animals to entertain the students. Following the approval of the 2015 bond package, Hyer Elementary School will be torn down and rebuilt beginning in the summer of 2019.

The HPISD administration decided that the new Hyer will only have two stories instead of three after members of the community expressed opposition to a three-story design.

Michael M. Boone Elementary 
In 2017 following a $361.4 million bond package approval which funded its land purchase and building, the most recent elementary school building between Wentwood Drive and Northwest Highway was added; the three-story building will house students from the other four existing elementary schools on a rotational basis until renovations are completed on the four campuses. The building currently serves as the home of the University Park Elementary School for the 2017–2018 school year. Because it was the first new school to be built in HPISD in nearly 70 years, much thought went into the design of the school. Key elements included larger classrooms, flexible group learning spaces, an underground parking garage, and an exterior appearance that mimicked that of the existing HPISD schools. It took from 20 June 2016 until August 2017 to complete the construction. Balfour Beatty Construction served as general contractor for the building process.

District

Information 
The district serves: all of the city of University Park, most of the town of Highland Park, and portions of Dallas.

In summary, today the District comprises seven campuses: five elementary school buildings, one middle school building, and one high school building. The district has an enrollment of approximately 7,000 students and employs 750 people, including more than 430 teachers. University Park Elementary School was designed by famed Dallas architects, Lang & Witchell who designed the Magnolia Building and the Kirby Building downtown.

In the 2015–2016 school year, the district employed 384 teachers. Of those, all had a college degree. For 27.4% of them, their highest degree was a Bachelors. For 71.2% of them, their highest degree was a Masters. For 1.4% of them, their highest degree was a Doctorate. This level of qualification outpaces the rest of the state, where usually only 23.6% of teachers can boast a Masters as their highest degree. 51% of HPISD teachers have more than 10 years of experience.

In 2009, the school district was rated "exemplary" by the Texas Education Agency.

HPISD and Highland Park High School received national attention in September 2014 for the banning of seven books previously used in high school English studies, after a group of parents protested the contents of these books. The seven books were: The Art of Racing in the Rain by Garth Stein; The Working Poor: Invisible in America by David K. Shipler; Siddhartha by Hermann Hesse; The Absolutely True Diary of a Part-Time Indian by Sherman Alexie; An Abundance of Katherines by John Green; The Glass Castle by Jeannette Walls; and Song of Solomon by Toni Morrison. Superintendent Orr eventually reversed the decision to suspend the books, stating in an email to parents, "I made the decision in an attempt to de-escalate the conflict, and I readily admit that it had the opposite effect. I take full responsibility for the decision, and I apologize for the disruption it has caused." He would retire shortly after the controversy ended.

In 2015, a $361.4 million bond package passed board approval and a citizens' vote. The package allowed for major renovations to all six existing campuses; the addition of a parking garage at Highland Park Middle School; the addition of new surface parking at Highland Park High School; the demolition of the high school's natatorium; and renovations to the Seay Tennis Center, the Multi-Use Building, and Highlander Stadium. Stantec Inc. and Balfour Beatty Construction were eventually hired to oversee most of the design and construction that ensued. In February 2016, the District sold $225 million in bonds with a 20-year amortization at an interest rate of 2.95%—lower than had been originally expected. Tax rates naturally increased within the District to cover the additional costs.

Leadership

School Board 
The District is run by a seven-member school board of trustees who are elected to three-year terms each May.

Superintendent 
The school board works with a paid superintendent. From 1914–2017, HPISD has been led by eight superintendents as follows:

Dr. William Buell Irvin 
Dr. William Buell Irvin served as assistant superintendent from 1944-1945 until taking the job over upon Superintendent Gable's retirement. Dr. Irvin retired in 1954; although he intended to retire earlier (in 1951), the fire at Armstrong Elementary made him feel he should stay on until the school was rebuilt.

Frank Monroe 
The Victory Apple still continues to this day; at pep rallies on the mornings of football games, the football coaching staff hand out free apples to the players and student body. He retired in 1974 after 20 years of service.

Dr. Dawson Orr 
Dr. Dawson Orr was known as an articulate, thoughtful and respected leader. He has served as president of the Texas Association of School Administrators (TASA), chairperson of TASA's legislative committee, and president of the Texas Leadership Center Board. He was named Superintendent of the Year by Communities in Schools in 2008 and Key Communicator of the Year by the Texas School Public Relations Association in 2005. He continues to serve as a member of TASA's legislative committee and the Visioning Institute, a study group made up of educational leaders focusing on school district redesign.

Dr. Tom Trigg 
Dr. Tom Trigg became the eighth and current superintendent for Highland Park Independent School District on June 22, 2015. He replaced Dr. Dawson Orr, who retired after nearly eight years with the district. Dr. Trigg was previously the superintendent of Blue Valley Unified School District in Overland Park, Kansas for 11 years. Dr. Trigg was featured as one of Education Week's 2015 Leaders to Learn From, and he was also named the 2011 Kansas Superintendent of the Year and one of four finalists for the National Superintendent of the Year. Dr. Trigg's contract keeps him with HPISD through June 30, 2022.

Academics
In 2016, the Moody Foundation presented Highland Park ISD with a grant of $5.8 million
to fund Science, Technology, Engineering, Arts and Mathematics (STEAM) education in the district. The district named the initiative the Moody Innovation Institute to bring a focus on STEAM education to all students in the district. HPISD hired Dr. Geoffrey Orsak, former Dean of SMU's Lyle School of Engineering, to serve as the Executive Director of the Moody Innovation Institute in March 2017. Currently, plans are in the offing to use part of the funds to create a redesigned internship experience for students at Highland Park High School. Teachers across the District have formed a joint Design Team to implement the Moody Innovation Institute's programs in classrooms.

HPISD offers an elementary school Spanish learning program in each of its four elementary schools. The overall program is called Foreign Language in Elementary Schools (FLES), but since Spanish is the main focus of the FLES program another name is often used: Passport to Spanish. Passport to Spanish begins second-language Spanish instruction for all HPISD students at the Kindergarten level and runs through fourth grade.

During the 2016–2017 school year, Highland Park High School had 27 students named National Merit Semifinalists, its highest number of students to earn the honor in the District's history, dating back to 1958. To be recognized for National Merit Honors, students must take the PSAT, and only 16,000 students out of a pool of more than 1.6 million entrants (1%) are recognized as National Merit Semifinalists.

The 2017 TEA Accountability Report for HPISD said that every single campus, and thus the District as a whole, had "Met Standard." The four indexes calculated by the TEA put HPISD  ahead of the state targets: 97 on Student Achievement (target of 60), 50 on Student Progress (target of 22), 68 on Closing Performance Gaps (target of 28), and 94 on Post-secondary Readiness (target of 60). HPISD earned a distinction in post-secondary readiness, making it one of just 58 districts in the state to do so.

Athletics

During the 2016–2017 school year, Highland Park High School won UIL State Championships in tennis, football, boys swimming and diving, girls soccer, and boys golf. More information on the high school's athletics can be found on the Highland Park High School page. The Highland Park Scots football team is the winningest program in Texas high school football history with 802 wins. The Scots have won six football state championships in school history: 1945, 1957, 2005, 2016, 2017 and 2018.

Schools

Secondary schools
Highland Park High School (University Park)(Scots)
Grades 9-12
Highland Park Middle School (Highland Park and University Park)(Raiders)
Grades 7-8
Arch H. McCulloch Intermediate School (Highland Park and University Park)(Raiders)
Grades 5-6
Note: Highland Park Middle School and McCulloch Intermediate School occupy separate wings of the same building. This same building was the original home of the high school in the early 20th century.

Elementary schools 
John S. Armstrong Elementary School (Highland Park)(Eagles)
National Blue Ribbon School in 1985 and 1986
John S. Bradfield Elementary School (Highland Park)(Broncos)
National Blue Ribbon School in 1989-90 and 2005
Robert S. Hyer Elementary School (University Park)(Huskies)
National Blue Ribbon School in 1993-94 and 2005
University Park Elementary School (University Park)(Panthers)
National Blue Ribbon School in 1987-88 and 2006
Note: A fifth elementary school, in the Dallas city limits on property formerly owned by Northway Christian Church opened in August 2017, but the building will serve as a temporary home to students from the other four elementary schools on a rotational basis until renovations are completed on the other four campuses. Eventually the new elementary school will open as its own school.

Student body 
In the 2015–2016 school year, HPISD had a student population of 7,171 people, of whom 2,114 were at Highland Park High School. The areas from which HPISD draws, Highland Park and University Park, have a reputation for being affluent, predominantly white areas. The student body went from being almost 99% white, to 86.5% white in 2015. The next biggest sections are a 6% Asian population and a 5% Hispanic population. 0.0% of the district's students are economically disadvantaged. The rate of violent or criminal incidents at every single campus in the district in 2015-2016 was 0.0%. From 1997 to 2016 the number of non-Hispanic white students increased  and the district never gained any significant low income population, contrasting with the white flight and increase in low income students in other Dallas County districts.

See also

List of school districts in Texas

References

External links

 Highland Park Independent School District

School districts in Dallas County, Texas
School districts in Dallas
School districts established in 1914
1914 establishments in Texas